Günter Brocker (24 May 1925 – 29 May 2015) was a German footballer and later manager.

In 1958, he won the German championship with Schalke 04, for which he made 152 appearances in the Oberliga West.

References

External links 
 

1925 births
2015 deaths
Footballers from Duisburg
German footballers
Association football fullbacks
FC Schalke 04 players
German football managers
1. FC Kaiserslautern managers
SV Werder Bremen managers
FC Schalke 04 managers
Tennis Borussia Berlin managers
Rot-Weiß Oberhausen managers
West German footballers
West German football managers